This is a list of yearly claims to an Independent South Atlantic football championship.
 1907 - NC A&M
 1910 - Georgetown or NC A&M
 1911 - Georgetown
1924 - Washington & Lee

References

External links
 AntiqueSportsShop

College football championships